Sadraldin Mustafa Sheykhoghlu (1340/1341 – ~1410) was Turkish poet and translator who had major influence on Ottoman diwan poetry especially the masnavi genre. Some sources have referred to him as "Mustafa Sheykhoghlu" or "Sadraldin Sheykhoghlu". The date of his death have been quoted around 1341 but its place is unknown.

Works 
His most famous is "Khurshid Nameh" which is also referred to as "Khurshid u Ferakhshad" and "Shehristan-i Ushagh". Other works are translations of Marzban nama, Qabus nama and Kenz ul-kubera.

References 

1341 births
Turkish poets
Turkish translators
1410s deaths